Accident is an unincorporated community in Township 2, Benton County, Arkansas, United States. It is located near Highway 264 north of Bethel Heights.

References

Unincorporated communities in Benton County, Arkansas
Unincorporated communities in Arkansas